Zilyaktau (Yeläktaw) is a rural locality (a village) in Shulganovsky Selsoviet, Tatyshlinsky District, Bashkortostan, Russia. The population was 11 as of 2010. There is 1 street.

Geography 
Zilyaktau is located 34 km southwest of Verkhniye Tatyshly (the district's administrative centre) by road. Salikhovo is the nearest rural locality.

References 

Rural localities in Tatyshlinsky District